The Tides That Bind may refer to:

 The Tides That Bind / A Message in a Bottle Story, a 2019 documentary short film about a message in a bottle finder
 "The Tides That Bind", the August 26, 2011 episode of the television series Haven